Anchordown was a Christian acoustic rock and worship band from Reno, Nevada.  They disbanded and reformed in Dec of 2008 under the new name, Zimmerman.

Band history
Anchordown started in early 2006. The band formed from a community of Christ-followers in Reno, NV called Living Stones. Donald Zimmerman started the band, with the notion that music could challenge the corporate church. Their music is melodic, with hopeful lyrics.

The band toured extensively throughout 2006-2008, covering most of the western United States, particularly Colorado, Utah, Washington, California, Nebraska and Texas.

The album Speaks So Still was recorded at Spaceway Studios and was produced by Will Hunt (Bethany Dillon, Shane and Shane, Shawn McDonald).  This album had 12 tracks, including the radio single Speaks So Still.

The album Stories and Songs was an underground release. It featured 30 tracks, including 10 previously unrecorded songs, with each new song featuring a corresponding track of audio interview of the band speaking on the origin and story behind each of the songs.  Tracks 24-29 were stories from their time on the road, including the feeding of a wild bald eagle, the stage at the Flood in San Diego catching fire, and the time a 2-foot piece of rebar flew through the floor panel of their instrument trailer. It served as a fundraiser for their first project under the new band name, Zimmerman.

Members

Donald Zimmerman - Lead vocals, acoustic guitar, piano, programming
Tim Millim - electric guitar
Cory Bettinghouse - bass guitar
Aaron Mueller - drums
Brennen Daley - background vocals, keyboards
Brandon Balkenbush - electric guitar, (2006)

Discography

Albums
 Can't Talk, Can't See (Jan 2006)
 Speaks So Still (Dec 2006)
 Stories and Songs (Sept 2008)

Singles
 the Wait - was produced by Grammy winner Randy Miller at Tierra Studios in Houston, TX. This song was a departure in style from their previous work.(Apr 2007)
 We Three Kings - was featured on the Beepcon Christmas compilation CD, a project spearheaded by Jeremy "B-wack" Bush, drummer for David Crowder*Band.(Dec 2007)

Notables
 Grand Prize winners of the national Unveiling Battle of the Bands 2007 (175 bands entered)
 2007 Finalists in the BWAM Competition in Nashville, TN (Band with a Mission) Battle of the bands held by Fervent Records

References

 Reno News and Review
 1. Living Stones BLOG
 2. BeepCon
 3. Tierra Studios
 4. BWAM
 5. Anchordown's MySpace
 6. Anchordown's YouTube Channel
 7. Neue Ministry
 8. Anchordown's Official Website
 9. Spaceway Studio

External links
 Anchordown
 Anchordown's MySpace
 Living Stones BLOG
 Anchordown's YouTube Channel

American Christian rock groups
Musical groups established in 2006